Corvus is a genus of birds commonly known as crows and ravens.

Corvus may also refer to:

 Corvus (boarding device), used by ancient Roman warships
 Corvus (constellation)
 Corvus (Chinese astronomy), the same constellation as considered in traditional Chinese uranography
 Corvus (heraldry), crows and ravens in heraldry
 Corvus: A Life With Birds, a 2008 non-fiction book by Esther Woolfson
 Corvus Hungary, an aircraft manufacturer
 Corvus Systems, a computer hardware manufacturer
 ASM-N-8 Corvus, United States Navy missile
 Gibson Corvus, a guitar product line
 Marcus Valerius Corvus (4th-century BC), Roman military commander and politician
 SS Corvus, a Norwegian steamship sunk by German U-boats in February 1945
Corvus, a character in Satyajit Ray's Professor Shonku series
 Corvus, a character in the video game Call of Duty: Black Ops III
 Corvus, a character in the video game Dragon Quest IX: Sentinels of the Starry Skies
 Corvus, a character in the video games Heretic and Heretic II
 The Corvus, a ship in the 2017 video game Star Wars Battlefront II
 Corvus Glaive, a Marvel comics character
 Corvus (imprint), an imprint of Atlantic Books
 Corvus chaff launcher, a British shipborne chaff decoy system manufactured by Vickers

Latin-language surnames